Sarid is a kibbutz in northern Israel. Located near Migdal HaEmek, it falls under the jurisdiction of Jezreel Valley Regional Council.

History

Ottoman-era village of Khanâfis
During the Ottoman era a Muslim village called Ikhneifis (also Khanâfis and other versions), meaning "beetles", stood at the site of present Sarid. Kneffis, and the neighbouring towns and villages of Nazareth, Mejdal, Yafa, Jebatha and Ma'alul, paid taxes to the monks of Nazareth, who bought the right to collect these taxes from the Ottoman authorities in 1777 for two hundred dollars. Thirty years later, they again purchased this right, though this time for two thousands five hundred dollars, owing to the rise in the price of cereals and ground rents. A map from Napoleon's invasion of 1799 by Pierre Jacotin showed the place, named as Karm Ennefiiceh.

In 1838, Ukhneifis  or Khuneifis was noted as a  village  in the Nazareth District.

In 1882, the PEF's Survey of Western Palestine (SWP) found at Ikhneifis the "ruin of a tower built by Daher el-Omar about a century ago (1162 A.H.)."
A population list from about 1887 showed that  Ikhneifis had about  40 Muslim inhabitants.  Gottlieb Schumacher, as part of surveying for the construction of the Jezreel Valley railway, noted in 1900 that Ikhneifis was a “flourishing village”, consisting of 52 huts and 230 inhabitants, and that the place was the property of the Sursocks, of Beirut.

Moshe Dayan mentioned it as an example of "there is not one place built in this country which did not have a former Arab population".

British Mandate era

The Arab village
At the time of the 1922 census of Palestine "Ikhnaifes" had a population of 39, 38 Muslims and 1 Orthodox Christian.

The Jewish kibbutz

The area was acquired by the Jewish community as part of the Sursock Purchase. The kibbutz was established by Jewish immigrants from Czechoslovakia, Poland and Soviet Union in 1926, on lands purchased from the village of Khuneifis. The land was sold by the Sursock family, its absentee landlords. The name was taken from the biblical city of Sarid, situated in the southern part of the tribe of Zebulun (Joshua 19:10). The ancient city is thought to be located in nearby Tel Shadud. By the 1931 census, Sarid had a population of 69, 3 Muslims and 65 Jews, in 9 houses.

Economy
In the 1950s the kibbutz established Camel Grinding Wheels (CGW), which now has three plants for the manufacture of cutting discs, grinding wheels and coated abrasives. One of the more profitable branches was the kibbutz dairy.

Notable people

The poets Natan Yonatan and Pinchas Sadeh and the politicians Natan Peled and Shlomo Rosen were members of the kibbutz.
The later Austrian president Heinz Fischer spent a voluntary year (1963) in the kibbutz.

References

Bibliography

External links
Kibbutz website 
Survey of Western Palestine, Map 8: IAA, Wikimedia commons
 Khnefis from Dr. Moslih Kanaaneh

Kibbutzim
Kibbutz Movement
Populated places established in 1926
1926 establishments in Mandatory Palestine
Populated places in Northern District (Israel)